Reporoa  is a rural community in Rotorua Lakes within the Waikato region of New Zealand's North Island.

It is located within the Reporoa Caldera, a caldera in the Taupo Volcanic Zone containing the Deer Hill, Kairuru and Pukekahu rhyolitic lava domes and the active Reporoa geothermal field. Several hydrothermal explosions have occurred in the area, with a large one being recorded in 1948, and another large one occurring in a cow paddock in April 2005.

Demographics
Reporoa is in two SA1 statistical areas which cover . The SA1 areas are part of the Golden Springs statistical area.

Reporoa had a population of 279 at the 2018 New Zealand census, unchanged since the 2013 census, and a decrease of 51 people (−15.5%) since the 2006 census. There were 99 households, comprising 141 males and 138 females, giving a sex ratio of 1.02 males per female, with 69 people (24.7%) aged under 15 years, 60 (21.5%) aged 15 to 29, 126 (45.2%) aged 30 to 64, and 24 (8.6%) aged 65 or older.

Ethnicities were 63.4% European/Pākehā, 51.6% Māori, 5.4% Pacific peoples, and 4.3% Asian. People may identify with more than one ethnicity.

Although some people chose not to answer the census's question about religious affiliation, 57.0% had no religion, 30.1% were Christian, 4.3% had Māori religious beliefs, 2.2% were Hindu and 2.2% had other religions.

Of those at least 15 years old, 9 (4.3%) people had a bachelor's or higher degree, and 57 (27.1%) people had no formal qualifications. 21 people (10.0%) earned over $70,000 compared to 17.2% nationally. The employment status of those at least 15 was that 108 (51.4%) people were employed full-time, 33 (15.7%) were part-time, and 24 (11.4%) were unemployed.

Golden Springs statistical area

Golden Springs had a population of 1,767 at the 2018 New Zealand census, a decrease of 30 people (−1.7%) since the 2013 census, and an increase of 3 people (0.2%) since the 2006 census. There were 609 households, comprising 939 males and 831 females, giving a sex ratio of 1.13 males per female. The median age was 31.6 years (compared with 37.4 years nationally), with 468 people (26.5%) aged under 15 years, 366 (20.7%) aged 15 to 29, 810 (45.8%) aged 30 to 64, and 123 (7.0%) aged 65 or older.

Ethnicities were 80.0% European/Pākehā, 29.9% Māori, 2.9% Pacific peoples, 4.9% Asian, and 1.5% other ethnicities. People may identify with more than one ethnicity.

The percentage of people born overseas was 12.4, compared with 27.1% nationally.

Although some people chose not to answer the census's question about religious affiliation, 59.8% had no religion, 26.1% were Christian, 2.5% had Māori religious beliefs, 0.7% were Hindu, 0.2% were Muslim, 0.5% were Buddhist and 2.4% had other religions.

Of those at least 15 years old, 165 (12.7%) people had a bachelor's or higher degree, and 258 (19.9%) people had no formal qualifications. The median income was $39,800, compared with $31,800 nationally. 225 people (17.3%) earned over $70,000 compared to 17.2% nationally. The employment status of those at least 15 was that 771 (59.4%) people were employed full-time, 216 (16.6%) were part-time, and 39 (3.0%) were unemployed.

Marae
Reporoa has four Ngāti Tahu - Ngāti Whaoa marae. Mataarae Marae and meeting house is a meeting place of Ngāti Mataarae and Ngāti Whaoa. Ōhākī Marae and Tahumatua meeting house is a meeting place of Ngāti Tahu. Te Toke Marae and Te Rama meeting house is a meeting place of Ngāti Te Rama and Ngāti Whaoa. Waimahana or Marapounamu Marae and Rahurahu meeting house is a meeting place for Ngāti Rahurahu.

Education

References

Rotorua Lakes District
Populated places in Waikato